Hypotrachyna vainioi is a species of foliose lichen in the family Parmeliaceae. It is found in Brazil.

Taxonomy
The lichen was described as a new species in 2009 by Harrie Sipman, John Elix, and Thomas Nash in their 2009 monograph on the genus Hypotrachyna. The type was collected by Sipman in September 1997. The specific epithet honours Finnish lichenologist Edvard Vainio, "the first experienced lichenologist to do lichenological fieldwork in the tropics, in southeastern Brazil".

Description
The upper surface of the thallus is pale grey with a smooth to shallowly wrinkled texture. The thallus completely lacks soredia, isidia, pustules, dactyls (finger-like protrusions), and lobules. The medulla is white, while the lower surface is black to dark brown near the margins. The apothecia are 2–10 mm wide with a dark brown disc. Ascospores of H. vainioi are ellipsoid and measure 10–12 by 5–8 μm.

Chemistry
Major secondary metabolites produced by the lichen are lichexanthone in the upper cortex, and echinocarpic acid in the medulla. Minor compounds include barbatic acid (minor), conechinocarpic acid (minor), subechinocarpic acid (minor), 4-O-demethylbarbatic acid (minor/trace), obtusatic acid (trace), and norobtusatic acid (trace).

Habitat and distribution
It is only known from the type locality in Minas Gerais, Brazil. Hypotrachyna vainioi grows as an epiphyte in open scrubland.

References

Literature cited

vainioi
Lichen species
Lichens of Southeast Brazil
Taxa named by John Alan Elix
Lichens described in 2009
Taxa named by Harrie Sipman
Taxa named by Thomas Hawkes Nash III